Lakri Nabiganj is a Community development block and a town in district of Siwan, in Bihar state of India. It is one out of 6 blocks of Maharajganj Subdivision. The headquarter of the block is at Lakri Nabiganj town.

The block is divided into many Village Councils and villages.

Gram Panchayats
Gram panchayats of Lakri Nabiganj block in Maharajganj Subdivision, Siwan district.

Baldiha
Basauli
Bhada khurd
Bhopat pur
Dumara
Gopalpur
Jagatpur
Khawashpur
Lakari
Lakhanaura
Parauli

See also
Maharajganj Subdivision
Administration in Bihar
 Village--Imadpur

References

Community development blocks in Siwan district